The Lienchiang Cross-Strait Matters Forum is a forum between Lienchiang County of the Republic of China (ROC) and Lianjiang County of the People's Republic of China (PRC) which started in 2019.

Forums

1st Forum
The first forum was held on 5 March 2019 in Matsu Folk Cultural Artifacts Exhibition Hall in Nangan Township, Lienchiang County of the Republic of China. Several topics regarding cross-strait sea transportation, tourism, aquaculture, education and health were discussed during the forum. The forum was attended by ROC Lienchiang County Magistrate Liu Cheng-ying.

See also
 Cross-Strait relations
 Cross-Strait Economic, Trade and Culture Forum
 Cross-Strait Peace Forum
 Straits Forum

References

2019 establishments in Taiwan
Cross-Strait relations
Matsu Islands